Ana Usabiaga Balerdi (born 19 January 1990) is a Spanish female  track cyclist. She competed in the points race event at the 2014 UCI Track Cycling World Championships.

Major results

2014
Copa Cuba de Pista
1st Points Race
3rd Scratch Race
3 Jours d'Aigle 
3rd Individual Pursuit
3rd Points Race
2015
Trofeu CAR Anadia Portugal
1st Scratch Race
2nd Omnium
2nd Points Race, Grand Prix of Poland
Trofeu Ciutat de Barcelona
2nd Scratch Race
3rd Points Race
2016
Trofeu Ciutat de Barcelona
2nd Points Race
2nd Scratch Race
3rd Scratch Race, Trofeu CAR Anadia Portugal
2017
3rd Scratch Race, TROFEU CIUTAT DE BARCELONA-Memorial Miquel Poblet

References

External links
 
 
 
 

1990 births
Living people
Spanish track cyclists
Spanish female cyclists
Place of birth missing (living people)
European Games competitors for Spain
Cyclists at the 2019 European Games
People from Ordizia
Sportspeople from Gipuzkoa
Cyclists from the Basque Country (autonomous community)
21st-century Spanish women